The Prague Lions are an American football team based in the Czech capital of Prague. The team will play in the European League of Football since 2023. The team was founded in 1991, making it the oldest in the Czech Republic.

Successes 
The Prague Lions won the Czech Bowl six times: 1998, 2004-2006, 2019 and 2022.

Roster

Staff

References

External links 
 Official website

American football teams in Europe
Sport in Prague
1991 establishments in Czechoslovakia
American football teams established in 1991